Stewarts & Hamiltons is an American reality documentary television series. Announced in April, the eight-part one-hour television series debuted on July 26, 2015 on the E! network. The show follows the blended families of Alana Stewart, including her children Kimberly Stewart, Ashley Hamilton and Sean Stewart, as well as her ex-husband and now best friend George Hamilton. In October 2015, the show was cancelled after airing one season.

Episodes

Broadcast
The series premiered in Australia and New Zealand on July 28, 2015 on E! Australia, and in the United Kingdom on the same day.

References

External links 

 
 
 

2010s American reality television series
2015 American television series debuts
2015 American television series endings
E! original programming
English-language television shows
Television series by Bunim/Murray Productions
Television shows set in Los Angeles